John Frere Pilgrim was Archdeacon of Antigua from 1936 until his death on 1 March 1941.

Pilgrim was educated at Codrington College and  ordained in 1913. After a  curacy at St Croix he held incumbencies in Saint Kitts, the Virgin Islands and Nevis.

Notes

20th-century Anglican priests
Alumni of Codrington College
Archdeacons of Antigua